Patrick Ryne Valaika (born September 9, 1992) is an American professional baseball infielder who is a free agent. He has played in Major League Baseball for the Colorado Rockies and Baltimore Orioles.

Career

Amateur career
Valaika attended William S. Hart High School in Santa Clarita, California and the University of California, Los Angeles (UCLA), where he played college baseball for the UCLA Bruins. In 2012, he played collegiate summer baseball with the Chatham Anglers of the Cape Cod Baseball League. He was drafted by the Colorado Rockies in the ninth round of the 2013 Major League Baseball draft.

Minor Leagues
Valaika made his professional debut on July 8, 2013 playing shortstop for the Tri-City Dust Devils of the Northwest League going 1 for 4 with an RBI triple.  Valaika started the 2014 season with the Asheville Tourists of the South Atlantic League batting .370 over 34 games before being promoted to the Modesto Nuts of the California League.  He spent two seasons in the Eastern League, 2015 with the New Britain Rock Cats and 2016 with the Hartford Yard Goats before being promoted to the Albuquerque Isotopes of the Pacific Coast League for the last month of the Minor League Baseball season.  During the 2016 season he earned Eastern League Mid-Season All-Star honors and was named a Colorado Rockies Organization All-Star, resulting in a September call-up for the Rockies.  Valaika would see time with Isotopes during the 2017, 2018, and 2019 seasons while also getting time in the Major Leagues.  During the 2019 season with Albuquerque he was named to the Mid-Season Pacific Coast League All-Star Game.

Colorado Rockies
The Rockies promoted Valaika to the major leagues for the first time on September 6, 2016, and made his Major League Baseball debut the same day pinch running for pinch hitter Tom Murphy in the bottom of the 8th inning during a game against the San Francisco Giants.  He made his first defensive appearance on September 8, 2016 replacing third baseman Nolan Arenado in the bottom of the sixth inning, a game where he also got his first plate appearance hitting a double in the bottom of the 8th inning.  His first start in the major leagues came against the Los Angeles Dodgers on September 24, 2016.    

On Mother's Day, 2017, Valaika hit two home runs, and on Father's Day that same year, he hit a pinch hit home run.

Baltimore Orioles
On October 30, 2019, Valaika was claimed off waivers by the Baltimore Orioles. However, Valaika was designated for assignment by the Orioles on January 10, 2020 to make room for Richard Ureña on their 40-man roster. 

On January 16, 2020, Valaika was claimed off waivers by the Arizona Diamondbacks. Valaika was designated for assignment by the Diamondbacks on January 27, following the acquisition of Starling Marte.

On January 30, Valaika was again claimed off waivers by the Baltimore Orioles. He was outrighted to the Norfolk Tides on February 11.  On July 17, 2020 Valaika was assigned to the Orioles Alternate Training Site and on July 23 the Orioles selected his contract.  

In 2020 for the Orioles, Valaika slashed .277/.315/.475 with 8 home runs and 16 RBI.

After having 193 at-bats, hitting .192 with 4 home runs and 21 RBI's, on August 5, Valaika was designated for assignment by the Orioles. On August 8, Valaika was sent outright to the Triple-A Norfolk Tides. There, he played in 22 games, hitting .225 with 2 home runs and 7 RBI's. On September 14, the Orioles re-selected Valaika's contract. Valaika was outrighted off of the 40-man roster on October 23 and granted free agency on October 25.

Atlanta Braves
On March 19, 2022, Valaika signed a minor league contract with the Atlanta Braves. He elected free agency on November 10, 2022.

Personal life
Pat is one of four brothers to play professional baseball. Chris, played professionally from 2006–2015, including time in Major League Baseball with the Cincinnati Reds, Miami Marlins, and Chicago Cubs.  Nick, was drafted by the Pittsburgh Pirates in 2017 and spent two years in their farm system with the Bristol Pirates and West Virginia Black Bears.  Matt, was drafted by the St. Louis Cardinals and played one season with the Batavia Muckdogs before retiring due to injury.

References

External links

UCLA Bruins bio

1992 births
Living people
Baseball players from California
Major League Baseball infielders
Colorado Rockies players
Baltimore Orioles players
UCLA Bruins baseball players
Chatham Anglers players
Tri-City Dust Devils players
Asheville Tourists players
Modesto Nuts players
New Britain Rock Cats players
Hartford Yard Goats players
Albuquerque Isotopes players
Naranjeros de Hermosillo players
American expatriate baseball players in Mexico
People from Valencia, Santa Clarita, California